Zhou Naixiang (born December 1961) is a Chinese political figure and state-owned enterprise executive, formerly served as the chairman of China State Construction Engineering. He currently serving as the Governor of Shandong.

Biography
Zhou was born in Yixing, Jiangsu. He graduated with a vocational degree from Nanjing University of Technology and later became a senior engineer. In 1982, after graduating, Zhou joined the Jiangsu Construction Engineering Company, where he was a construction worker, translator, then technician. He joined the Chinese Communist Party in December 1987. He went on to the company's branch in Shanghai, where he ascended through the management ranks. He also worked for the company as a member of the senior management team in the United States.

In July 2003, he became vice mayor of Taizhou, Jiangsu, then joined the municipal Party Standing Committee in 2006. In 2008, he was named head of the Jiangsu department of tourism. In October 2010, he was named deputy head of the Jiangsu department of Urban Development and Housing. In February 2012, he was named acting mayor of Suzhou, confirmed four months later. In January 2016, he was named party chief of Suzhou, succeeding Shi Taifeng, who had been promoted to provincial governor.

In September 2019, he was appointed as the Chairman of China State Construction Engineering.

In September 2021, he was appointed as the Governor of Shandong.

References 

Politicians from Suzhou
1961 births
Living people
Governors of Shandong
Mayors of Suzhou
Nanjing University of Technology alumni